Ali al-Kourani is a Lebanese Shia scholar cleric. He was born in 1944 in Yater (Lebanon) In Jabal Amel, migrating to Najaf, Iraq to study in a hawza in 1958.

In 1967, Grand Ayatollah Muhsin al-Hakim sent him to Kuwait to educate Shia people. He returned to Lebanon in 1974, and established a mosque and a hospital. He lived in Lebanon until 1980. After the Islamic Revolution in Iran, he moved to Qom, Iran. He established center of Fiqhi Lexicon and Mustafa Center for Religious Studies in Qom.

His teachers 
 Grand Ayatollah Muhsin al-Hakim.
 Grand Ayatollah Abu al-Qasim al-Khoei.
 Grand Ayatollah Mohammad Baqir al-Sadr.
 Grand Ayatollah Mohammad Saeed Al-Hakim.

Researches 
Most of his research in hadiths is focused on Imam Mahdi, his appearance and the circumstances of the world before his coming. Over the recent years, he has been frequently interviewed in Shia communities for providing political analysis of Middle East developments in the light of End Time Hadiths. He believes that according to prophecies the recent events in Mid-East are prelude to appearance of Imam Mahdi. For example, he holds that creation of a group which closely resembles ISIS has been prophesied in Shia narrations, particularly in a hadith from Ali ibn Abi Talib. As for the utopian government of Mahdi, he stresses it will incomparable to existing governments of the world.

Books 
He has written many books, many of them listed below:
 Epoch of Appearance is the most famous book of Ali Al-Kourani. This book is written in Arabic. This book is about the events that occur before the appearance of Imam Mahdi in Shia beliefs. In this book he describes the fate of nations and ethnicities, such as Iran, Yemen, Egypt, Iraq, Romans, Turks, Jews and Arabsat in the End time according to the Shia and Sunni narrations. Also in a part of the book he mentions a Sunni viewpoint about Imam Mahdi.
 Smoothing of Appearance of Mahdi
 Saint Peter in Islamic Narrations
 Imam Hasan al-Askari Father of Imam Mahdi
 Questions About Mahdaviat
 To Know and Love Allah Almighty
 Answer to the Suspicion of Sheikh and Sayed in the Vision of Imam al-Mahdi 
 Description of Al-Yasin Prayer
 Life of Imam Ali al-Hadi is Full of Jihad and Miracles
 Vocabulary Words of the Quran Raghib Isfahani with Notes
 Imam Muhammad al-Jawad
 Dajjal of Basra
 Three Births
 Egypt and Ahl Al-Bayt
 New Reading About Islamic Conquests(Two volumes)
 Reading the New Wars of Apostasy
 Islamic Beliefs (Five volumes)
 The Victory (Nine volumes)
 Jewel of History
 The Thousand Questions and Forms on the Violators of the Ahl Al-Bayt(Three volumes)
 The Knowledge of Allah
 Codification of the Quran
 The Lexicon Substantive Ahadith of Imam Mahdi
 How Shias Responded to the Mongol Invasion
 Quran of Ali
 Interpretation of the Three Verses of Ghadir
 The Quraysh Conflict with the Prophet
 In Search of Light
 Tidings of the Prophet To Twelve Imams
 The Book of Truth is Set Forth in the Knowledge of the Infallible
 Response to Extremist Fatwas
 Verses of Qadir
 From Prayers of Prophet
 Human Rights at the Ahl Al-Bayt
 Point of View About Marja'
 A Book About Ahmad Al-Katib
 Rosary of Karbala
 What is Narrated in Oversight of the Prophet and His Sleep
 Fruits of Ideas
 Ali al-Akbar ibn Husayn Was Similar to His Grandfather Mustafa
 Islamic Unity from the Viewpoint of the Ahl Al-Bayt
 Write Down on My Winding Sheet
 Sirah Rasul Allah Among Ahl Al-Bayt (Three volumes)
 Epoch of Shia
 Imam Musa al-Kadhim the Lord of Baghdad 
 To the Seeker of Knowledge (His Biography)
 Arab Tribal Series in Iraq (Ten volumes)
 Pearls of Grammar

See also
List of Shia Muslim scholars of Islam

References

External links 
 His official website 

1944 births
Lebanese Shia Muslims
Living people
Critics of Sunni Islam
Islamic Dawa Party